Is 4 Lovers is the fourth studio album by Canadian rock duo Death from Above 1979. The album was released on March 26, 2021, through Universal Music Canada.

The album was proceeded by the single, "One + One", which was released on February 3, 2021.

Reception
Is 4 Lovers has received generally positive reviews. At Metacritic, which assigns a normalized rating out of 100 to reviews from professional publications, the release received an average score of 71, based on 11 reviews, indicating "generally favorable reviews". The album received four-star reviews from both Allmusic and NME. Writing for the former, Matt Collar praised the album for its "sonically vibrant production" that "feels bigger and more robust than you might expect." Meanwhile, writing for the latter, Andrew Trendell described Is 4 Lovers as "their best album since their debut, adding that "Death From Above still pack a punch, but the bruise is a lot more colourful this time." Exclaim!s Ashley Hampson gave the album an eight out of 10, in particular praising the song "One + One" for "showcasing how much they've grown since their early days." 

More mixed reviews came from The Independent and Kerrang!, who each gave the album three stars. The former's Roisin O'Connor said that while "much of their self-produced album... is great," it was also "a little deflating for a band whose history is based on boundary-pushing." The latter's Mark Sutherland, meanwhile, was critical of the band's attempt to change their sound in the latter half of the record. "It's a good idea to mix things up," he wrote, "but the move also renders them less visceral and dilutes their identity."

Track listing

Personnel
Jesse F. Keeler – bass guitar, synthesizer, piano, keyboards, programming, backing vocals, production
Sebastien Grainger – vocals, drums, percussion, programming, production

Charts

References

2021 albums
Death from Above 1979 albums
Universal Music Canada albums